The 2012 IIHF World Championship Division I was an international Ice hockey tournament run by the International Ice Hockey Federation. Group A was contested in Ljubljana, Slovenia and Group B was contested in Krynica, Poland with both tournaments running from 15–21 April 2012.

In Group A both Austria and Slovenia were promoted back to the highest level after being relegated from there in 2011.  Ukraine was relegated despite winning their final game against Japan.  The Japanese, returning to play after a one-year absence, finished fourth attaining an overall placement of 20th.  This is the highest they have placed since being relegated to this level in 2004 when the Asian qualifiers for the world championships ceased.

In Group B the South Koreans defeated Poland on the final day to earn promotion to Group A.  For the Korean team, this assures them of the highest world championships placement in their history when they play in 2013.  The host Poles did not trail a game until 8:21 left in their final match but could not equalize and ended up second.  Australia and Romania, the two teams who had moved up from Division II for this year's tournament, faced off on the final day to determine relegation.  Australia needed to win by two goals, but failed to do so, and finished last.

Participants

Group A

Group B

Group A Tournament

Standings

All times are local (UTC+2).

Statistics

Top 10 scorers

IIHF.com

Goaltending leaders
(minimum 40% team's total ice time)

IIHF.com

Tournament awards
 Best players selected by the directorate:
 Best Goalkeeper:  Robert Kristan
Best Defenseman:  Matthias Trattnig
Best Forward:  Manuel Latusa
IIHF.com

Group B Tournament

Standings

All times are local (UTC+2).

Statistics

Top 10 scorers

IIHF.com

Goaltending leaders
(minimum 40% team's total ice time)

IIHF.com

Tournament awards
 Best players selected by the directorate:
 Best Goalkeeper:  Ian Meierdres
Best Defenseman:  Adam Borzecki
Best Forward:  Marcin Kolusz
IIHF.com

References

External links
Group A
Group B

IIHF World Championship Division I
2
World
World
2012 IIHF World Championship Division I
2012 IIHF World Championship Division I
IIHF World Championship Division I